The Niles Masonic Temple  is a historic Masonic building in Niles, Ohio.  It was constructed in 1923 as a meeting hall for a local Masonic lodge, and was listed on the National Register of Historic Places in 2006.  In 2009 the Masons moved to new premises, and today the building houses the Genesis Christian Community Center.

References

External links

Masonic buildings completed in 1923
Clubhouses on the National Register of Historic Places in Ohio
Buildings and structures in Trumbull County, Ohio
National Register of Historic Places in Trumbull County, Ohio
Former Masonic buildings in Ohio
Niles, Ohio